Shaun Micallef's Stairway to Heaven is an Australian television factual series on SBS, starring comedian and writer Shaun Micallef.

Episodes
The series first screened as a documentary in 2015 titled "Gods, Gurus and the Ganges". It returned on 18 January 2017 as a 3-part series with episodes titled "Mormons", "Spiritual Healing" and "Armageddon".

References

External links

Artemis Films

2015 Australian television series debuts
Special Broadcasting Service original programming
Australian comedy television series